North Point State Park is a public recreation area located on Chesapeake Bay in Edgemere, Baltimore County, Maryland. The state park includes the site of the former Bay Shore Park, which was one of the state's premiere amusement parks during the first half of the 20th century. The park features restored remnants of the old amusement park as well as facilities for swimming, picnicking, bicycling, and hiking. Black Marsh, a  state wildlands area, makes up half the park's area. The park is administered by the Maryland Department of Natural Resources.

History
The park occupies the southeastern portion of Patapsco River Neck, a peninsula of historically agricultural use. Evidence suggests that the area was first occupied by humans 9000 years ago. Members of the Susquehannock, a tribe of the Iroquois nation, inhabited the area. During the War of 1812, it was on the route traveled by British troops intent on invading Baltimore from the southeast and several skirmishes were fought there. The site was used for farming for some three and a half centuries before becoming the site of Bay Shore Amusement Park, a popular destination for summer visitors from 1906 through 1947.

Bay Shore Park
Bay Shore Amusement Park (or Bay Shore Park) was built on 30 acres in 1906 by the United Railways and Electric Company of Baltimore using plans drawn up by architects Otto Simonson and Theodore Wells Pietsch. During its time, the park was a lively and attractive place offering a variety of recreations and relaxation along the Chesapeake Bay. Activities included a dance hall, bowling alley, restaurant, and pier. In addition to the trolley/streetcar from Baltimore, visitors could reach the park by steamboat from Baltimore to the park pier. Jimmy Doolittle won the Schneider Trophy seaplane race held at the park in 1925, an event attended by aviation pioneers Orville Wright and Glenn L. Martin.

In 1947, Bethlehem Steel bought and tore down the amusement park. The attractions were moved to a new park, Bay Island Beach, in the 1950s, which was then torn down by Bethlehem Steel in the 1960s. In 1987, the Maryland Department of Natural Resources purchased the land from Bethlehem Steel for five million dollars to create what was then known as Black Marsh State Park.

In 1992, Bay Shore Amusement Park and its trolley station were evaluated by the Maryland Historical Trust for the National Register of Historic Places. They were found to eligible because of their association with streetcar-related recreation. The park was a big proponent of the use of streetcars and used them for recreation.

Activities and amenities
The park has several piers and provides beach access to visitors for wading and swimming. There are picnic tables and grills on site. The historical fountain has been restored, as well as the old trolley station, which is used by permit for large gatherings.

The Takos Visitor Center, which opened in 2002, was named in honor of Volunteer Ranger Steve Takos who spearheaded the renovation efforts at the park. It was designed to resemble the amusement's park former hotel and restaurant, and boasts an educational science room, multiple history and nature-oriented exhibits, including a large saltwater fish tank, and a conference room.

The center piece for the original fountain was designed and built by Carl (aka Karl) August Ludwig Fickert, a coppersmith born in Herford North Rhine-Westphalia, Germany in 1869.  Carl Fickert arrived and settled in Baltimore in 1901 and continued his craft as a coppersmith.  He later went on to marry Marie Kraft and father nine children.   The fountain was presumed lost or destroyed after the closure of Bay Shore; however in 2012 it was discovered in the attic of the late Mr. Hall by his grandson. Mr. Hall owned and operated a restaurant at Bay Shore Amusement Park between 1906 and		 
1947.   The copper fountain was apparently removed from the pedestal when the park closed and the property was sold to Beth Steel.  It was discovered after Mr. Hall died and his family was cleaning out the attic of his home.  He probably removed the copper fountain head for safe keeping and forgot he had it.  Unfortunately the decorative top piece of the fountain was never found.  This added piece is what gave the original fountain it majestic height and added to the ambience of the promenade in the early days of the park.

References

External links
North Point State Park Maryland Department of Natural Resources
North Point State Park Map Maryland Department of Natural Resources

State parks of Maryland
Parks in Baltimore County, Maryland
Beaches of Maryland
Protected areas established in 1987